The Titus Canyon Formation is an Eocene geologic formation in California. H. Donald Curry collected the type specimens of the three teleosts Fundulus curryi, Fundulus euepis, and Cyprinodon breviradius in the Titus Canyon Formation. Both of these genera are present in the Titus Canyon Formation sediments of Death Valley National Park.

Footnotes

References
Hunt, ReBecca K., Vincent L. Santucci and Jason Kenworthy. 2006. "A preliminary inventory of fossil fish from National Park Service units." in S.G. Lucas, J.A. Spielmann, P.M. Hester, J.P. Kenworthy, and V.L. Santucci (ed.s), Fossils from Federal Lands. New Mexico Museum of Natural History and Science Bulletin 34, pp. 63–69.

Paleogene California